Namrata Rao (born 17 June 1981) is an Indian film editor, who works in Hindi cinema, where starting with Oye Lucky! Lucky Oye! (2008), she edited films like Ishqiya (2010), Band Baaja Baaraat (2010), Ladies vs Ricky Bahl (2011) and Kahaani (2012). She is most famous for editing and acting in the film  Love Sex Aur Dhokha (2010) for which she received the Filmfare Award for Best Editing in 2011. She received National Film Award for Best Editing and Filmfare Award for Best Editing for the critically acclaimed Kahaani (2012).

Early life and education
Born to a middle-class family in Delhi, she obtained a degree in IT, but left the field to pursue film.

Career
She started her career as a graphic designer, also worked with NDTV for a while, before deciding to study film making at Satyajit Ray Film and Television Institute, Kolkata.

Filmography
 Baba Black Beard (Short, 2006)
 I'm The Very Beautiful! (Documentary, 2006)
 Mila Kya? (Documentary, 2007)
 Three Blind Men (Documentary, 2007)
 Oye Lucky! Lucky Oye! (2008)
 Dahleez Paar (Documentary, 2008)
 Ishqiya (2010)
 Love Sex Aur Dhokha (2010)
 Band Baaja Baaraat (2010)
 With Love, Delhi (2011)
 Ladies vs Ricky Bahl (2011)
 Kahaani (2012)
 Life Ki Toh Lag Gayi (2012)
 Shanghai (2012)
 Jab Tak Hai Jaan (2012)
 Shuddh Desi Romance (2013)
 2 States (2014)
 Titli (2014)
 Katiyabaaz (Documentary, 2014)
 Ahalya (Short, 2015)
 Detective Byomkesh Bakshy! (2015)
 Dum Laga Ke Haisha (2015)
 Fan (2016)
 Kahaani 2 (2016)
 Befikre (2016)
 Anukul (2017)
 Lust Stories (2018)
 Badla (2019)
 Made in Heaven (TV Series, 2019)
 Ghost Stories (2020)
 Mismatched (TV Series, 2020)
 House of Secrets: The Burari Deaths (Documentary Series, 2021)
 Jayeshbhai Jordaar (2022)
 Mrs Chatterjee Vs Norway (2023)

Awards

References

External links
 

1981 births
Living people
Artists from Delhi
Hindi film editors
Filmfare Awards winners
Satyajit Ray Film and Television Institute alumni
Best Editor National Film Award winners